The Belgian Road Cycling Cup (also known as Lotto Cycling Cup after its sponsor) is a road bicycle racing competition established in 2016 and consists of a number of standalone one-day races, mostly in Belgium but since 2022 some are held as well in the Netherlands. In each race, the top 15 riders score points and the rider scoring the most points in total is crowned the Belgian Cycling Cup champion. A separate classification was kept for the best youngster and best team, but these have been cancelled since 2017 and 2018 respectively.

The lead sponsor changed regularly throughout the years, causing the official name to change often as well: from 2016 to 2018 it was known as the Napoleon Games Cycling Cup, from 2019 to 2021 as the Bingoal Cycling Cup, in 2022 as the Exterioo Cycling Cup, and since 2023 as the Lotto Cycling Cup.

Points distribution 
For the individual rankings, points are awarded to all eligible riders each race according to the following table:

Additionally, during each race there are three intermediate sprints for which the top three riders receive three, two and one point respectively.

Until 2018, the positions of the first three riders of each team were added together to give the team position with only riders finishing in the top 50 taken into account. The team with the lowest team position was the winner of the team competition for that race. E.g.: a team having their first three riders all on the podium will have a team position score of 1+2+3=6 and since no other team will have a lower team position, this team won 12 points for the team standings. Note that first all teams with three (or more) riders finishing in the top 50 were ranked, then the teams with only two riders, then teams with only one rider. Finally, each race the team of the winning rider received two bonus points.

Winners

Statistics 
, after the Grote Prijs Jean-Pierre Monseré

Most event wins (individual)

Most event wins (nation)

Most event wins (team) 
Defunct teams in italics

See also
 French Road Cycling Cup
 Italian Road Cycling Cup

Notes

External links
Exterioo Cycling Cup 

 
Recurring sporting events established in 2016
Cycle racing in Belgium
2016 establishments in Belgium
Cycle racing series